Catherine Stokes is a pioneering African-American member of the Church of Jesus Christ of Latter-day Saints (LDS Church). She is also a retired deputy director of the Illinois Department of Public Health and a community volunteer.

Stokes was born in Doloroso, Mississippi as the youngest daughter of six in a family of sharecroppers. After a challenging childhood, which included her father being shot in a domestic violence episode, Stokes moved to Chicago when she was five to live with a great aunt. She lived in Chicago much of her life and became the first member of her family to graduate from college. She attended the Michael Reese Hospital School of Nursing and obtained a bachelor's degree in nursing from DePaul University.

While in Hawaii for a business conference Stokes visited the Laie Hawaii Temple and filled out a visitor card. LDS Church missionaries visited her in Chicago and she began attended the local congregation. Stokes was baptized on April 28, 1979 at the church's Hyde Park, Chicago meetinghouse. She continues to be an advocate for minorities in the LDS Church and is considered a pioneer for African-Americans.

Civic work
Stokes has participated in volunteer, civic, and activist work, including serving as vice chairman of the board of trustees of the Chicago Inner City Youth Charitable Foundation for 16 years, serving as a member of the Utah AIDS Foundation board of trustees, serving on the board of the Salt Lake City Public Library, and was named as a member of the Editorial Advisory Board for the Deseret News. She is also a member of the Utah chapter of the Afro-American Historical and Genealogical Society.

Personal life
Stokes has one daughter and lives in Salt Lake City, Utah.

References

Latter Day Saints from Illinois
Converts to Mormonism
Living people
DePaul University alumni
Year of birth missing (living people)
Latter Day Saints from Utah
African-American Latter Day Saints